Nepal Tarun Dal is the youth wing of Nepali Congress Party. The organization is one of the most influential youth organizations in Nepal with working level committees in all districts. The organization has a publication by the name of Tarun.

History
In 2012, the Nepal Tarun Dal stated their belief that the election scheduled by the government was unconstitutional.
On 14 April 2012, Nepali Congress announced Central committee of Tarun dal with 45 members, which is headed by President Udaya Shumsher Rana. Nepal Tarun Dal plans to hold its 4th National General Convention in the first week of February 2013.

Murder of Nabin Rana Magar

In 2013, the group stated that they believed that the death of Committee Member Nabin Rana Magar was murdered for political revenge. Nabin Rana Magar was found at the bottom of a cliff near Salleri VDC, and the subsequent investigation found that he had been murdered with a sharp weapon. Four people were arrested.

Notes

Nepali Congress
Youth wings of political parties in Nepal
1953 establishments in Nepal